Mitchell Marner (born May 5, 1997) is a Canadian professional ice hockey right winger and alternate captain for the Toronto Maple Leafs of the National Hockey League (NHL). He was selected fourth overall by the Maple Leafs in the 2015 NHL Entry Draft.

Playing career

Minor
While Marner was growing up, he began developing his on ice skills with 3 Zones Hockey School. He attended The Hill Academy in Vaughan, Ontario, and then Blyth Academy.

Marner played his minor career in the Durham Region and the Greater Toronto Hockey League (GTHL). He played in the 2011–12 season with the Vaughan Kings and went on to win a GTHL title.

For the 2012–13 season, Marner transitioned to the Don Mills Flyers of the GTHL, where he played his minor midget year, registering 86 points in 55 games. He finished second in scoring in the GTHL behind Dylan Strome (who was then playing with the Toronto Marlboros). At the end of his season with the Flyers, Marner was immediately invited to join the St. Michael's Buzzers of the Ontario Junior A Hockey League, where he went on to win a championship.

During his minor midget season, Marner was initially unsure of his plans for the following season. He received a scholarship offer from the University of Michigan to play for the Wolverines ice hockey team, while also being drafted by the London Knights in the first round of the 2013 OHL Priority Selection, 19th overall.

Major junior
Despite receiving a scholarship offer from the University of Michigan, Marner elected to sign with the London Knights, who selected him with their first round pick in the 2013 Priority Selection.

Marner had a strong rookie season with the Knights, registering 59 points in 64 games and was the runner-up for the OHL rookie of the year, behind Travis Konecny.

During the 2014–15 season, Marner played superbly alongside linemate Max Domi. As the season progressed, Marner was consistently included as one of the top prospects in the 2015 NHL Entry Draft, being listed as a definite top ten pick, if not top five. He would lead the league in scoring for most of the season until Dylan Strome of the Erie Otters recorded six points in the final game of the season, bumping Marner to second. As reward for his outstanding sophomore season, Marner was named to the OHL First All-Star team and awarded the Jim Mahon Memorial Trophy as the OHL's highest scoring right wing player. Marner was selected fourth overall by the hometown Toronto Maple Leafs in the 2015 Draft.

On July 28, 2015, the Leafs signed Marner to a three-year, entry-level contract.

On October 1, 2015, Marner was named as co-captain of the Knights along with teammate Christian Dvorak. Marner played most of the season at right wing on a line with Dvorak and Matthew Tkachuk. The trio was a dominant force and the Knights ended the regular season as the highest scoring team in the OHL. Marner himself finished the regular season second in OHL scoring with 116 points in 57 games and was awarded the Red Tilson Trophy as the OHL's most outstanding player of the year.

Marner played an important role during the Knights' 2016 playoff run, resulting in the team winning the OHL Championship. He led the playoffs in scoring and with 44 points in 18 games and was awarded the Wayne Gretzky 99 Award as playoff MVP.

Marner helped lead the Knights in winning the 2016 Memorial Cup. He won both the Stafford Smythe Memorial Trophy and the Ed Chynoweth Trophy as tournament MVP and leading scorer.

Marner was the second player (after Brad Richards in 2000) ever to win a Memorial Cup, a Stafford Smythe Memorial Trophy, CHL Player of the Year, a league MVP trophy (Red Tilson Trophy) and a league playoff MVP trophy (Wayne Gretzky 99 Award) in the same season.

Toronto Maple Leafs

2016–17
After an impressive training camp and pre-season (in which he led the team with four assists), it was announced that Marner would remain on the Toronto Maple Leafs roster for the upcoming 2016–17 season. He made his NHL debut in the team's season opener on October 12. Despite an effective first game with six shots on goal, he was overshadowed by a historic four-goal debut from teammate Auston Matthews. The next game on his first night playing in Hockey Night in Canada, Marner would score his first NHL goal after receiving a pass between his legs. He would record his first career assist four days later.

On October 27, 2016, in a game against the Florida Panthers, Marner had his first multi-point game, accumulating three assists to lead the Leafs to a 4–2 win. Marner would then have his first multi-goal game against the Buffalo Sabres on November 3, 2016, as the Leafs won 2–1. On November 15, 2016, Marner had three points in a 6–2 win over the Nashville Predators, which at the time tied him in the lead for Leafs' leading scorer (with James van Riemsdyk) for the first time of his career.

Marner was named the NHL's Rookie of the Month for January 2017 after leading all rookies with 11 assists and 15 points in 13 games. He also led all rookies with eight power-play points and matched a career-high three point game. Marner was the third Leaf to be named Rookie of the Month during the 2016–17 season, making the Maple Leafs the first NHL team with three different Rookie of the Month honorees in one campaign.

Marner also set the Maple Leafs record for most assists in a season by a rookie with 42 on the year. This broke the previous record which was held for 73 years by Gus Bodnar, who had 40 assists in the 1943–44 season. Marner spent the entire season on a line with Van Riemsdyk and Tyler Bozak, finding offensive chemistry with the two veterans, and managed to finish the year with 61 points. The trio of Marner, William Nylander, and Auston Matthews became only the second team since the 1981 Quebec Nordiques to have three rookies finish with at least 60 points. His play assisted the team in qualifying for the 2017 Stanley Cup playoffs, where he scored his first playoff goal on his first shift of Game 1. Marner recorded four points in the series but it was not enough as the team lost in six games against the top-seeded Washington Capitals.

2017–18
On December 19, 2017, during the Maple Leafs' Next Century Game, Marner broke a 15-game goal drought and recorded a four-point game, the first time in his career. He scored one goal and three assists to help defeat the Carolina Hurricanes 8–1. On February 10, 2018, Marner scored his first five-point game (two goals and three assists), becoming the first Leafs player to record five points in a game since Tomáš Kaberle in 2009. Marner ended the regular season leading the Leafs in assists and points, and setting career highs in goals, assists and points. His offensive play helped the Leafs to their second consecutive Stanley Cup playoffs appearance. During the 2018 Stanley Cup playoffs, Marner became the first Maple Leafs player since Brian Leetch to have a five-game point streak in the Stanley Cup playoffs. He led the Leafs in playoff scoring with nine points but the Maple Leafs were eliminated by the Boston Bruins in seven games during the first round.

2018–19
On October 9, 2018, Marner recorded a four-point game (one goal and three assists) in a 7–4 win over the Dallas Stars. On October 27, Marner recorded his 100th career assist on a game-tying goal by Jake Gardiner against the Winnipeg Jets to help the Leafs win 3–2. In the last 20 years, only Mario Lemieux recorded more primary assists in his first 24 games of the season than Marner, who recorded 22 primary assists in his first 24 games. On January 3, Marner tied a Maple Leaf record for fastest goal to start a game by scoring seven seconds into a game against the Minnesota Wild. Marner scored again within the same period but the Leafs lost 4–3 to the Wild. On January 17, 2019, Marner recorded a goal during a 4–2 win over the league-leading Tampa Bay Lightning, becoming the first player in Maple Leafs franchise history to begin his NHL career with three consecutive 60-point seasons. On February 23, during a 5–3 win over the rival Montreal Canadiens, Marner recorded two assists to record the 200th point of his NHL career. He finished the regular season leading the team in scoring and third in the NHL with assists with career-highs of 26 goals, 68 assists and 94 points, becoming the first Maple Leaf to record at least 90 points in a season since Mats Sundin in 1996–97.

2019–20
On September 13, 2019, Marner signed a six-year, $65.358 million contract with the Maple Leafs. At the start of the 2019–20 season, Marner was named an alternate captain for the team. On November 9, 2019, during a game against the Philadelphia Flyers, Marner fell awkwardly onto his leg and was expected to miss a minimum 4 weeks due to an ankle injury. He played strongly in his return on December 4 in a loss against the Colorado Avalanche. On December 23, 2019, Marner recorded his 2nd career five-point game (two goals and three assists) in thrilling 8–6 win over the Carolina Hurricanes at the Leafs 3rd annual Next Generation Game. Down 6–4 in the 3rd period, Marner sparked the Leafs comeback when he one-timed a spinning cross-ice pass from Auston Matthews to cut the Hurricanes lead. Mitch then set up Tyson Barrie for the game tying goal 53 seconds later. Just 6 seconds after tying, Marner stole the puck and scored the game-winning breakaway goal. Mitch had recorded the Leafs' previous five-point game on February 10, 2018. On January 11, 2020, he was selected to participate in the NHL All-Star Game for the first time in his career. On February 7, 2020, Marner recorded his 200th NHL assist on a late overtime goal scored by John Tavares in a 5–4 win over the Anaheim Ducks.

The regular season ended abruptly due to the onset of the COVID-19 pandemic. Months later, the NHL arranged to hold the 2020 Stanley Cup playoffs in a bubble, with Eastern Conference games held in Toronto. The Maple Leafs faced the Columbus Blue Jackets in the qualifying round, and lost 3–2. Marner managed only four assists in five games, attracting criticism from fans and commentators for his lack of playoff production.

2020–21
Due to the COVID-19 pandemic and resultant limitations on cross-border travel, the 2020–21 NHL season occurred under a vastly different arrangement than previously, with the Leafs grouped in an all-Canadian North Division and playing exclusively within that division for the regular season. On April 15, 2021, Marner became the fourth player in Maple Leafs history to record at least five consecutive seasons with 40 assists. The Maple Leafs finished first in the North Division, and faced the Montreal Canadiens in the first round of the 2021 Stanley Cup playoffs, where they were considered the heavy favourites to win, which would have been the team's first playoff series win since 2004. The Leafs lost the first game of the series, but won the next three to take a seeming stranglehold. However, they went on to lose the next three games and the series 4–3, the team's fifth-straight early exit. Marner again scored only four assists in the post-season, this time in seven games, further amplifying criticism of his perceived underperformance. At the end of the year, Marner was named to the  NHL First All-Star Team on right wing, the first time a Maple Leafs player was named to the NHL's First All-Star team since Börje Salming in 1977.

2021–22
With the restoration of the traditional season, Marner enjoyed another highly successful regular season, recording 35 goals and 62 assists in 72 games. Marner, Matthews and newcomer Michael Bunting formed one of the most successful forward lines in the league for much of the year. On February 26, 2022, Marner recorded a career high four goals and six points to help the Toronto Maple Leafs to a 10-7 win over the Detroit Red Wings. It was the first NHL hat-trick and four-goal game in his career. After recording a natural hat-trick in the second period, Marner capped off his night by scoring the Leafs' tenth goal, his fourth of the game, on a Michael Bunting breakaway drop-pass that Marner started deploying that season. The last time the Maple Leafs recorded 10 goals in a game was a 10-2 victory on Jan. 4, 2007 over the Boston Bruins.  Having accrued 97 points, Marner hoped to become only the fourth Maple Leaf player to break the 100-point barrier, but coach Sheldon Keefe opted to sit him out of the final game of the season to prepare for the playoffs. Marner admitted it was "definitely tough," but said that "at the same time, I want to just make sure I'm ready to go." At the end of the year, Marner was again named to the NHL First All-Star team as the league's best right winger, joining teammate Auston Matthews on the first team. 

Advancing into the Stanley Cup playoffs, Marner and the Maple Leafs drew the Tampa Bay Lightning, two-time defending champions, in the first round. Marner had not scored a goal in eighteen playoff games prior to the beginning of the series, and in light of disappointing results against both the Blue Jackets and the Canadiens, how he would perform against the Lightning was subject to considerable speculation. In Game 1 of the series against the Lightning, Marner scored his first playoff goal since April 11, 2019, as part of a 5–0 Leafs victory. He had two assists as well, nearly equaling his totals from each of the previous two playoff series in a single game.

International play

Marner made his international debut for Canada at the 2014 Ivan Hlinka Memorial Tournament, where he won a gold medal. He tied Mathew Barzal for the leading scorer from Canada at the tournament.

At the 2016 IIHF World Junior Championships in Helsinki, Marner and Dylan Strome each scored four goals and two assists in five games to lead Canada in scoring. Canada reached the quarterfinals but was eliminated by hosts Finland. Marner scored twice in the game, both times to bring Canada back to an even score, but it was not enough to overcome the eventual gold medalists.

Marner made his Canada senior team debut at the 2017 IIHF World Championship, where team Canada won silver. Scoring 12 points in 10 games, Marner was placed in the top ten in scoring and was only second to Nathan MacKinnon in team scoring.

Personal life
Marner was born in Markham, Ontario, and spent the majority of his life in the neighbourhood of Thornhill. His parents are Paul and Bonnie Marner, and he has an older brother, Christopher, who is four years older. The Marners consider themselves an animal family; they currently own two pets: a cat named Burbank and a chocolate Labrador named Winston.

Marner attended Hill Academy, a private school focused on athletics, located in Vaughan. He would later go to Blyth Academy. At Blyth, Marner partnered with Knights teammates Christian Dvorak and Owen MacDonald to establish a café known as MOD Feast, with "MOD" being an acronym for each creators names (Marner, Owen and Dvorak). The group offered "bagels and stuff", with Fridays being designated to serving pizza.

Growing up, Marner was a fan of the Toronto Maple Leafs, the team that eventually drafted him. He was also a fan of the Chicago Blackhawks and Pittsburgh Penguins due to the presence of his two favourite players, Patrick Kane and Sidney Crosby. Marner has listed his favourite movie as Step Brothers, his favourite television show as The Big Bang Theory and cited his favourite video games as the Grand Theft Auto and Call of Duty series.

In July, 2020, Marner became part owner of OverActive Media, an esports company with Call of Duty and Overwatch teams based in Toronto.

In May 2022, Marner was the victim of a carjacking, in which his Range Rover was stolen but he was uninjured.

Career statistics

Regular season and playoffs

International

Awards and honours

Filmography

References

External links

1997 births
Living people
Canadian ice hockey right wingers
Ice hockey people from Ontario
London Knights players
National Hockey League All-Stars
National Hockey League first-round draft picks
People from Thornhill, Ontario
Sportspeople from Markham, Ontario
Toronto Maple Leafs draft picks
Toronto Maple Leafs players